Kribi Airport  is a public use airport located  southeast of Kribi, on the Gulf of Guinea, in the Océan Department, Sud Region, Cameroon.

See also
List of airports in Cameroon

References

External links 
 Airport record for Kribi Airport at Landings.com

Airports in Cameroon
South Region (Cameroon)